Tethya aurantium, also known as the golf ball sponge or orange puffball sponge, is a species of sea sponge belonging to the family Tethyidae. It is spherical in shape, with a warty surface, and grows to about 10 cm in diameter. Oscula are present on the upper surface. The surface has sharp protruding spicules which can cause skin irritation if touched.

It is found in the Mediterranean Sea and North Eastern Atlantic Ocean, and from southern Namibia round the southern African coast to KwaZulu-Natal, usually on shallow reefs.

It was first described by Peter Simon Pallas in 1766 as Alcyonium aurantium.

References 

Hadromerida
Animals described in 1766
Taxa named by Peter Simon Pallas